Qurb Ali is a village in northern Syria located west of Homs in the Homs Governorate. According to the Syria Central Bureau of Statistics, Qurb Ali had a population of 623 in the 2004 census. Its inhabitants are predominantly Alawites.

References

Bibliography

 

Populated places in Talkalakh District
Alawite communities in Syria